Edward Turner Bennett (6 January 1797 – 21 August 1836) was an English zoologist and writer. He was the elder brother of the botanist John Joseph Bennett.
Bennett was born at Hackney and practiced as a surgeon, but his chief pursuit was always zoology. In 1822 he attempted to establish an entomological society, which later became a zoological society in connection with the Linnean Society. This in turn became the starting point of the Zoological Society of London, of which Bennett was Secretary from 1831 to 1836.
His works included The Tower Menagerie (1829) and The Gardens and Menagerie of the Zoological Society (1831). He also wrote, in conjunction with G. T. Lay, the section on Fishes in the Zoology of Beechey's Voyage (1839).
In 1835 he described a new species of African crocodile, Mecistops leptorhynchus, the validity of which was confirmed in 2018.

See also
:Category:Taxa named by Edward Turner Bennett

References

External links
 
 
 Bennett, Edward Turner (1830–31) The gardens and menagerie of the Zoological Society..., two volumes

1797 births
1836 deaths
English zoologists
Secretaries of the Zoological Society of London
People from Hackney Central